Clepsis steineriana is a species of moth of the family Tortricidae. It is found in Spain, Portugal, France, Germany, Austria, Switzerland, Italy, the Czech Republic, Slovakia, Slovenia, Bosnia and Herzegovina, Poland, Greece and Russia.

The wingspan is 21–22 mm for males and 17–20 mm for females. The forewings are golden yellow with a grey to olive-green basal area. Adults have been recorded on wing from July to August.

The larvae feed on Vaccinium myrtillus, Vaccinium uliginosum, Veratrum album, Pulsatilla vulgaris and Luzula species.

References

Moths described in 1796
Clepsis